The Home Port Doctrine is a principle of United States law resulting from the Foreign Commerce Clause of the Constitution. It establishes that no state or local government can impose a property tax on commerce having its home port in another country as no taxable situs exists. Thus, ships with foreign registration are tax exempt except for port fees. As a result of this doctrine, the United States has no merchant ships with U.S registration.

References 

Taxation in the United States